McLelland is a surname. Notable people with the surname include:

Charles McLelland (1930–2004), the controller of BBC Radio 1 and 2 from 1976 to 1978, and of BBC Radio 2 from 1978 to 1980
Dave McLelland (born 1952), retired Canadian professional ice hockey goaltender
Douglas McLelland, Scottish footballer
Randal McLelland (born 1985), International Skeet shooter competing in the 2008 Olympic games
Ronald McLelland (1926–2014), Progressive Conservative party member of the Canadian House of Commons
Tim McLelland (1962–2015), Aviation photographer, journalist and author